The Sea Dog Table is one of the treasures of Hardwick Hall, along with the Eglantine Table. It is an elaborately carved table from around 1600, and is regarded as one of the most important examples of 16th century furniture in Britain.

The table is made of inlaid walnut. The 'sea dogs' of its name are four mythical chimera that support the table top above the stretcher.

The table is the subject of some historical anecdotes concerning the Cavendish family. There are doubtful stories that it may have been a possession of Queen Elizabeth I or Mary Queen of Scots, but it may well have been made after both of these were dead.

See also
 Vladimir Putin's meeting table

References

Tables (furniture)
Individual pieces of furniture
Derbyshire